Ivan Kirillovich Maksimenko (born on February 23, 1907 - May 31, 1976,) was a geneticist, doctor of biological sciences, professor, member of the Academy of Sciences of the Turkmen SSR (Soviet Socialist Republic (since 1959), and a Hero of Socialist Labor (1965).

Biography 
He was born on February 23, 1907, in the village of Mykhailivka (now Kamyansky district of Cherkasy Oblast). He received his primary education in Ukraine, then studied in Tashkent, and worked in Turkmenistan.

Scientific activities 
His main areas of scientific research were selection and seed production of cotton. He revealed the patterns of hereditary change of cotton plants in remote hybridization and developed methods to accelerate the selection process. For the first time in the USSR, he bred varieties of cotton with naturally dyed fiber, which was a strategic raw material during the German-Soviet war (camouflage made of natural brown and green cotton was not recognizable from the air). He created valuable varieties of fine-fibrous cotton.

Distinctions 
 Honored Worker of Science of the Turkmen SSR
 Honored Agronomist of the TSSR
 Hero of Socialist Labor (1965 for high achievements in breeding new varieties of cotton)
 He was awarded three orders of the Red Banner.

Memorial 
In recent years he lived and died in Kyiv. His tomb is at Baikove Cemetery (plot No. 33).

References 

1907 births
1976 deaths
Burials at Baikove Cemetery
Heroes of Socialist Labour
Recipients of the Order of Lenin
Recipients of the Order of the Red Banner
Soviet geneticists